Wendi may refer to:

 Wendi, a variant spelling of the given name Wendy
 Emperor Wen (disambiguation), several Chinese emperors
 Wendi (town) (文地镇), a township-level division in Bobai County, Guangxi, China
 Wind ENergy Data & Information (WENDI) Gateway, a digital library for wind energy-related data and information

See also

Wends, a historical name for Slavs living near Germanic settlement areas
Wende (disambiguation)
Wenden (disambiguation)
Wendy (disambiguation)